Lois Maikel Martínez González (born 3 June 1981 in Havana) is a male discus thrower from Cuba. In 2015, he changed his allegiance to Spain. His personal best throw is 67.45 metres, achieved in July 2005 in Havana.

Career
He finished sixth at the 2002 World Junior Championships. He also competed at the 2003 World Championships and the 2004 Olympic Games without qualifying for the final round. On the regional level he won the bronze medal at the 2003 Pan American Games and the silver medal at the 2005 Central American and Caribbean Championships. He became Cuban champion in 2002 and 2006, having a rivalry with Alexis Elizalde and Frank Casañas.

Achievements

References

Other sources
Así lleva el confinamiento Lois Maikel en somosatletismo.com

</ref>

Exteral links
 
 
 
 
 

1981 births
Living people
Cuban male discus throwers
Spanish male discus throwers
Olympic athletes of Cuba
Olympic athletes of Spain
Athletes (track and field) at the 2004 Summer Olympics
Athletes (track and field) at the 2016 Summer Olympics
Athletes (track and field) at the 2020 Summer Olympics
World Athletics Championships athletes for Cuba
World Athletics Championships athletes for Spain
Spanish Athletics Championships winners
Pan American Games bronze medalists for Cuba
Pan American Games medalists in athletics (track and field)
Athletes (track and field) at the 2003 Pan American Games
Medalists at the 2003 Pan American Games
Athletes (track and field) at the 2018 Mediterranean Games
Mediterranean Games competitors for Spain
Cuban emigrants to Spain
Athletes from Havana